William Martin may refer to:

Arts
 William Martin (painter) (1753–c. 1836), English history painter
 William Martin (architect) (1829–1900), British architect
 William Martin (garden designer) (born 1953), plantsman and garden designer
 William Martin (novelist), American novelist
 William Martin (tenor) (1898–?), American opera singer
 William E. Martin (1945–2016), American songwriter, screenwriter and voice actor
 William H. "Dad" Martin, American photographer
 William Martin (director), American stage director

Military
 William T. Martin (1823–1910), American lawyer, politician and Confederate States Army general
 William Martin (Royal Navy officer) (c. 1696–1756), naval officer and admiral
 Sir William Martin, 4th Baronet (1801–1895), First Sea Lord of Britain, 1858–1859
 William Martin (American sailor, USS Benton) (1835–1914), New York born American Civil War sailor and Medal of Honor recipient
 William Martin (American sailor, USS Varuna) (1839–?), Irish born American Civil War sailor and Medal of Honor recipient
 William Martin (Royal Marine officer), invented by British military intelligence for a Second World War deception plan
 William Franklin Martin (1863–1942), United States Army general

Politics and government
 Sir William Martin (Athelhampton), MP for Dorset in 1478
 William Martin (MP for Exeter) (died c. 1609), MP for Exeter (UK Parliament constituency), 1597
 William D. Martin (1789–1833), US congressman from South Carolina
 William Martin (merchant) (1806–1859), American merchant, politician in Tennessee 
 Sir William Martin (judge) (1807–1880), first Chief Justice of New Zealand, 1841–1857
 William Harrison Martin (1822–1898), U.S. Representative from Texas
 William V. Martin (c. 1870s–?), British Vice-Consul in Ferrol, Spain
 William T. Martin (mayor) (1788–1866), mayor of Columbus, Ohio
 Lee Martin (politician) (William Lee Martin, 1870–1950), New Zealand politician of the Labour Party
 William Melville Martin (1876–1970), premier of Saskatchewan
 William Martin (Canadian politician) (1886–1973), Canadian clergyman and politician
 William Martin (Scottish politician) (1886–1939), British MP for Dunbartonshire, 1923–1924
 William McChesney Martin (1906–1998), American business executive, former Federal Reserve Chairman
 William Martin (Australian politician) (1834–1917), New South Wales politician
 William B. Martin (1846–1916), American politician
 William O'Hara Martin (1845–1901), American merchant, politician and banker from Nevada
 William E. Martin (New York politician) (1886–1923), American politician from New York

Science, engineering and philosophy
 William Martin (naturalist) (1767–1810), English naturalist and palaeontologist
 William Martin (philosopher) (1772–1851), English inventor, eccentric, and philosopher
 William Charles Linnaeus Martin (1798–1864), English naturalist
 William Clyde Martin Jr. (1929–2013), American physicist
 William Keble Martin (1877–1969), British botanist
 William A. Martin (1938–1981), American computer scientist
 William F. Martin (born 1957), American botanist and molecular biologist
 William Flynn Martin (born 1950), energy economist, educator, and international diplomat
 William Hamilton Martin (1931–1987), American cryptologist, defector to the Soviet Union

Sport
 William Martin (Australian cricketer) (1856–1938), Australian cricketer
 William Martin (English cricketer) (1844–1871), English cricketer
 William Martin (footballer), professional footballer for Huddersfield Town
 William Martin (sport shooter) (1866–1931), American Olympic sport shooter
 William Martin (swimmer), Australian Paralympic swimmer
 William Martin (water polo) (1906–1980), British Olympic water polo player
 William Martin (Olympic sailor) (1828–1905), French sailor
 William C. Martin, University of Michigan athletics director
 William K. Martin (c. 1868–1949), American college football and baseball coach
 Trevor Martin (umpire) (William Trevor Martin, 1925–2017), New Zealand Test cricket umpire

Others
 William Martin (born 1796), with Bass and Flinders in Tom Thumb, see Martin Islet (New South Wales)
 William Alexander Parsons Martin, American Presbyterian missionary and translator
 William Byam Martin, English merchant and official of the East India Company
 William Clyde Martin (1893–1984), American Methodist bishop
 William Joseph Martin Jr. (1868–1943), president of Davidson College
 William R. H. Martin, American businessman
 William Thomas Martin (1883–?), South Australian school inspector

See also
 Billy Martin (disambiguation), includes people known as Bill Martin
 Willie Martin (born 1951), American-born Canadian football player
 Willie Martin (Scottish footballer), Scottish footballer
 William Martyn (disambiguation)